Za'im is an Arabic word meaning "leader" or "boss". It is occasionally used in English with two meanings:

 to refer to Abd al-Karim Qasim, President of Iraq from 1958 to 1963, popularly known as al-za'im
 to refer to the leaders of Lebanese sectarian groups, militias, or other important traditional political leaders corresponding to some degree to what are often termed notables in writing on the Middle East.